Ghulam Ali Allana (15 March 1930 – 28 November 2020) was a writer, critic and linguist. He was Vice-chancellor of Allama Iqbal Open University Islamabad and chairman of the Sindhi Language Authority based in Hyderabad, Sindh.

Education
Allana was born 15 March 1930 at village Tarr Khuwaja, Taluka Jati, Sujawal District. He was schooled in his village, Mirpur Bathoro, Tando Muhammad Khan and then Karachi. He was awarded a Bachelor of Arts (Hons) in 1953 and a Master of Arts in Sindhi from the University of Sindh in 1955. In 1962, he was awarded scholarship for study abroad and did a Master of Arts in linguistics at SOAS, University of London. He did PhD from the University of Sindh in 1971 under the supervision of Allama Ghulam Mustafa Qasmi. He was the first person to complete a Ph.D. at the university.

Professional career
He was appointed as a teacher at Training College for men, then, lecturer in Sindhi at City College Hyderabad. He was appointed as a lecturer at University of Sindh in 1958. He was given additional charge as assistant director of Institute of Sindhology in 1963 and held the position till 1983. Besides, he was lecturer in Sindhi Department in University of Sindh since 1977. For the development of Institute of Sindhology, Mr. Allana did untiring efforts. From 9 August 1983 to 18 April 1989 he cherished the seat of a Vice-chancellor of Allama Iqbal Open University Islamabad. He was Vice Chancellor of Sindh University in 1993. Government of Sindh made him chairman of Sindhi Language Authority Hyderabad in 1998. He was on different high posts of educational and literary organizations of his country and abroad.

Literary career
Allana started his literary career by writing Afsana (short stories). He also tried poetry using the pen name "Nashad". His first works, 'Chaur' [Thief] and 'Laash' [Corpse], were published in 1954. His last book, 'Origin of Sindhi Language,' was published in 2007. In 1952, he wrote a novel titled Lash.

Publications
He published Sindhi Dictionary, Idea maker of Encyclopedia Sindhiana, a project of Sindhi Language Authority. He wrote more than 55 books and 200 Research papers other countless write-ups on Languages and Dialectics as well as on teaching methodologies. His written work has been published in various newspapers and magazines.

Award
In recognition of his meritorious services in the field of Literature and Education, he was bestowed with Sitar-e-Imtiaz in 1993 by the Government of Pakistan. In 1983 Writer Guilds honored him with the award of excellence for his splendid services in the field of literature.

Death
Ghulam Ali Allana died at the age of 91 on 28 November 2020.
He was laid to rest in a graveyard near New Sabzi Mandi in Hyderabad on Sunday.

References

Sindhi-language poets
Sindhi people
1930 births
2020 deaths
University of Sindh alumni
Alumni of the University of London
Pakistani Sindhologists
People from Sujawal District
Recipients of Sitara-i-Imtiaz
Academic staff of the University of Sindh
Academic staff of Allama Iqbal Open University